Alexander Nikolayevich Spesivtsev (born 1 March 1970) is a Russian serial killer, also known as The Novokuznetsk Monster and The Siberian Ripper, convicted for the killing of 4 people in Novokuznetsk in 1996.

Spesivtsev, with the assistance of his mother Lyudmila, targeted street children and young women across Novokuznetsk by luring them into their apartment, where they would be tortured and killed, and sometimes cannibalized. Despite only being convicted for 4 murders, Spesivtsev confessed to 19 murders that he was accused of by police, and based on evidence is believed to have committed over 80 killings as early as 1991.

Early life
Alexander Nikolayevich Spesivtsev was born 1 March 1970 and raised in an apartment on Pionerskiy Prospekt in central Novokuznetsk, the largest city in Kemerovo Oblast, RSFSR, Soviet Union. He was underweight at birth but survived, although he was frequently ill afterwards. During childhood, Spesivtsev was considered unsocial, did not have friends, and was bullied while at school. His mother Lyudmila Spesivtseva worked at a nearby school and the prosecutor's office and was very affectionate towards her son. His father was an abusive alcoholic who abandoned the family. Spesivtsev and his mother held a strong, but unusual, relationship, as Lyudmila would regularly show her son photographs of corpses from books about criminal cases at a very young age, and the two shared a bed until Alexander was 12. Growing up, Spesivtsev showed increasing sadistic tendencies, and in 1988, met his first girlfriend. Ostensibly poetic by nature, they often went for walks together, but the façade didn't last. Arguments led to her breaking up with him, which Spesivstev did not accept. He kidnapped her and tortured her for a month in his apartment, until she died of sepsis. For this, at the age of 18, Spesivstev was assigned to the Oryol Special Psychiatric Hospital (Орловской психиатрической спецлечебнице).

Crimes
Though in official databases, he was, at the time, still listed as undergoing treatment, in 1991, he was discharged. Once out, he began associating with transients and beggars and developed a deep-seated hatred of street children, whom he viewed as a byproduct of Russia's emerging democracy. Spesivstev was likewise particularly embittered by an episode during his commitment at the Oryol Hospital, in which he asked another patient to insert a metal ball into his urethra to make him more virile. This had the opposite effect, causing erectile dysfunction and genital pains.

Alexander and then Lyudmila began to lure victims into their apartment, chosen at random, where Alexander would torture and eventually kill them. Unaccompanied street children attending discothèques and playing in construction sites had become commonplace in the impoverished city of Novokuznetsk since the collapse of the Soviet Union, and they became his main target. The bodies of victims would sometimes be cannibalized Lyudmila would dispose of unwanted remains by throwing them from buckets into the Aba River, late at night.

Investigation
The first sign of his victims arose when the gangrenous severed heads, torsos, and arms of unidentifiable children were found washed up on the banks of the River Aba. It was not immediately believed there was a serial killer, and only after several large groups of unattended children disappeared was a serial mass murderer suspected as being active in the city.

Otherwise, investigators in the regional Directorate of Internal Affairs suspected that organ smugglers were acting within the city's boundaries. Several criminal gangs from the Caucusus region were active in Novokuznetsk at the time, and police searched the baggage of outward flights. Additionally, several hundred internal troops and police officers were deployed to  search for the killer; at some point thought to be Oleg Rylkov.

Arrest and sentencing
Witness statements following the disappearance of several girls who were seen leaving a store with his mother helped police identify her. Her son was officially listed as undergoing a course of treatment at a psychiatric hospital. One morning, the neighborhood police officer and a plumber complained that a resident refused to let them in his apartment to relieve a clog. The resident claimed he was mentally ill and kept in his apartment. This alarmed police, as her son was ostensibly still at the hospital in Oryol.

The two men forced their way into his apartment, where they smelt an intense and putrid odor, resembling unspecified rotting. A woman bleeding from a severe stab wound to the chest, and a decapitated, de-limbed torso was uncovered in the bathtub. Spesivtsev escaped "at the final moment" via the building's roof. He was arrested within the week, found at the entrance of his house, cold and without food. Lyudmila was arrested three days before on October 27, 1996.

Spesivtsev kept a diary detailing some of his crimes and did not deny his actions when captured. However, he confessed only to 19 murders and boasted of crimes that couldn't be proven. During the search of his apartment, 80 articles of bloody clothing, nearly 40 jewelry items and some photos of unknown people, who were possibly unproven victims, were found. Police experts later concluded the garments belonged to the 19 victims. He was ruled insane by a court and committed to a psychiatric hospital, and had previously been confined to a mental institution for 3 years after torturing and killing his girlfriend. The only living witness and Spesivtsev's last victim, 15-year-old Olga Galtseva, died the following day after being discovered.

Today, Spesivtsev resides at the Kamyshin Regional Hospital. His mother, who was charged with complicity to three murders, was sentenced to 13 years in prison.

See also
 List of Russian serial killers
 List of serial killers by number of victims

References

External links 
 Идёт маньяк по городу
 Тень людоеда

1970 births
Male serial killers
Living people
Russian cannibals
Russian murderers of children
Russian serial killers
Torture in Russia
Violence against women in Russia